Félix Pyat (4 October 1810 – 3 August 1889) was a French socialist journalist, playwright, politician and a leading figure of the Paris Commune.

Biography
He was born in Vierzon (Cher), the son of a Legitimist lawyer. Called to the bar in Paris in 1831, he threw his whole energies into journalism. The violent personal attacks in a pamphlet entitled Marie-Joseph Chénier et le prince des critiques (1844), in reply to Jules Janin, brought him six months' sojourn in the Sainte-Pélagie prison, in the cell just vacated by Lamennais. In 1846 he edited the collected works of Claude Tillier in four volumes and wrote a detailed introduction to Tillier's biography and work.

He worked with other dramatists in a long series of plays, with an interval of six years on the National, until the revolution of 1848. George Sand, whom he had introduced in 1830 to the staff of Le Figaro, now asked Ledru-Rollin to make him commissary-general of the Cher. After three months' tenure of this office he was elected by the Cher department to the constituent assembly, where he voted with the Mountain, and brought forward the celebrated motion for the abolition of the presidential office.

About this time he fought a duel with Proudhon, who had called him the aristocrat of democracy. He joined Ledru-Rollin in the attempted insurrection of 13 June 1849, after which he sought refuge in Switzerland, Belgium, and finally in England, where he became involved with the irregular masonic organisation, La Grande Loge des Philadelphes. For having glorified regicide after Orsini's attempt on the life of Napoleon III he was brought before an English court, but acquitted, and the general amnesty of 1869 permitted his return to France. However, further outbursts against the authorities, followed by prosecution, compelled him to return to England.

The deposing of Napoleon III on 4 September 1870 brought him back to Paris, and it was he who in his paper Le Combat displayed a black-edged announcement of the negotiations for the surrender of Metz to the Prussians. After the insurrection of 31 October he was imprisoned for a short time. In January 1871, Le Combat was suppressed, only to be followed by an equally virulent Vengeur.

Elected to the National Assembly of France, he retired from Bordeaux, where it sat, with Henri Rochefort and others until such time as the so-called "parricidal" vote for peace should be annulled. He was superseded on the committee by Delescluze, but he continued to direct some of the violent acts of the Commune, the overthrow of the Vendôme column, the destruction of Adolphe Thiers's residence and of the expiatory chapel built to the memory of Louis XVI. He escaped the vengeance of the Versailles government, crossed the frontier in safety, and, though he had been condemned to death in his absence in 1873, the general amnesty of July 1880 permitted his return to Paris.

He was elected to the Chamber of Deputies for the department of Bouches-du-Rhône in March 1888 and took his seat on the extreme Left, but died at Saint-Gratien the following year.

References

External links
 

1810 births
1889 deaths
People from Vierzon
French socialists
Burials at Père Lachaise Cemetery
19th-century French journalists
French male journalists
19th-century male writers
Communards